Monty Fritts (born December 10, 1963) is an American politician. He serves as a Republican member for the 32nd district of the Tennessee House of Representatives.

Life and career 
Fritts attended Liberty University and the University of Tennessee.

In August 2022, Fritts defeated Teresa Pesterfield Kirkham, Keaton Bowman, Donnie Hall and Randy Childs in the Republican primary election for the 32nd district of the Tennessee House of Representatives. In November 2022, he defeated Jan Hahn in the general election. He succeeded Kent Calfee.

References 

1963 births
Living people
Republican Party members of the Tennessee House of Representatives
21st-century American politicians
Liberty University alumni
University of Tennessee alumni